Dolly Ki Ayegi Baraat is a Pakistani drama serial and second installment of the Baraat Series, aired on Geo Entertainment in 2010. The series stars Bushra Ansari, Saba Hameed, Javed Sheikh, Samina Ahmed, Natasha Ali and Nabeel Butt, respired their roles from the previous season while Ali Safina and Ayesha Omer joined for this season. Directed by Nadeem Baig and Marina Khan, the script was co-written by Bushra Ansari and Vasay Chaudhry.
The story revolves around the marriage and wedding plans of Azar's cousin Dolly and also focuses on the themes of cultural clash and our attitude towards the class system of society.

Cast 
 Bushra Ansari as Saima Chaudhry
 Javed Sheikh as Faraz Ahmed
 Saba Hameed as Rabia Ahmed
 Samina Ahmed as Mehrunnisa
 Shehryar Zaidi as Chaudhry Nazeer Ahmed
 Natasha Ali as Dolly
 Ali Safina as Mushtaq (Takkay)
 Raheel Butt as Nabeel
 Uroosa Siddiqui as Sukaina (Sukhi)
 Sana Askari as Laila Chaudhry
 Asad Siddiqui as Vicky Chaudhry
 Hassan Niazi as Azar
 Ayesha Omer as Sila Cahudhry
 Hajra Khan as Malka Rani
 Sumbul Shahid as Mustaq's mother
 Syed Mohammad Ahmed as Nabeel's father
 Ismat Zaidi as Nabeel's mother

Cameo appearances
 Marina Khan as herself
 Nomi Ansari as himself

Accolades

References

External links 
  Official website
 

Pakistani drama television series